South Carolina Highway 14 (SC 14) is a state highway in the U.S. state of South Carolina. The state highway runs  from U.S. Route 76 Business (US 76 Bus.) in Laurens north to Interstate 26 (I-26) in Landrum. SC 14 connects Laurens and Landrum with Greer, the city between Greenville and Spartanburg where the highway crosses I-85 and US 29. The highway also parallels I-385 through Fountain Inn and Simpsonville, South Carolina in southeastern Greenville County. SC 14 is a part of the National Highway System between I-85 and US 29 in Greer.

Route description
SC 14 begins at an intersection with US 76 Business (Main Street) in the city of Laurens. The state highway heads north through the Laurens Historic District as Church Street, which starts as two lanes but expands to four lanes as it approaches US 76 (Hillcrest Drive). The two highways run concurrently for a short distance before US 76 splits west onto Anderson Drive. SC 14 reduces to two lanes shortly before it exits the city limits. The state highway heads northwest parallel to CSX's Spartanburg Subdivision. The highway passes by several stretches of Old Laurens Road and passes through the hamlet of Barksdale before reaching the town of Gray Court, where the highway intersects SC 101 (Mill Street). North of town near the hamlet of Owings, SC 14 has a trumpet interchange with I-385. The state highway runs concurrently with the four-lane freeway to a modified diamond interchange at the southern edge of Fountain Inn. SC 14 parallels the railroad into town as Laurens Road and then becomes Main Street at the Laurens–Greenville county line. The highway intersects SC 418 (McCarter Road) and passes the historic Cannon Building.

SC 14 leaves Fountain Inn and continues to parallel the railroad as the Main Street of Simpsonville. In the center of town next to the historic Burdette Building, the highway intersects Curtis Street, which heads east as SC 417. The highways run concurrently to the northern edge of town, where SC 417 continues straight on Main Street toward interchanges with I-385 and Interstate 185 in Mauldin while SC 14 turns northeast. The highway crosses Gilder Creek and passes through the unincorporated Greenville suburb of Five Forks, where the highway gains a center turn lane, meets the western end of SC 296 (Five Forks Road), and intersects SC 146 (Woodruff Road). Between the hamlets of Batesville and Pelham, SC 14 crosses the Enoree River and enters Spartanburg County, where the road expands to four lanes plus a center turn lane. The road temporarily becomes a divided highway through its single-point urban interchange with I-85 just west of the Interstate's interchange Aviation Drive, the main access road to Greenville-Spartanburg International Airport. Just north of I-85, SC 14 returns to Greenville County and becomes a six-lane highway with a center turn lane that passes along the western edge of the airport property. The state highway meets the western end of SC 80 (J. Verne Smith Parkway) on the southern edge of the city of Greer, through which the highway follows Main Street, which reduces to four lanes at Old Buncombe Road.

SC 14 enters the downtown area of Greer and drops to two lanes after crossing over Norfolk Southern Railway's Greenville District and meeting CSX's Spartanburg Subdivision at grade. At the center of downtown, the state highway intersects Poinsett Street, which carries SC 101 and SC 290. SC 14 continues as a four-lane road to its junction with US 29 (Wade Hampton Boulevard), where the highway becomes two lanes again. On the northern edge of Greer, the highway crosses Frohawk Creek and the South Tyger River just downstream from the dam that impounds Cunningham Lake. SC 14 leaves the suburban area around Greenville and meets the eastern end of SC 414 just south of its bridge over the North Tyger River. The highway intersects SC 11 (Cherokee Foothills Scenic Highway) at Gowensville before curving northeast, crossing the Pacolet River, and re-entering Spartanburg County. SC 14's name becomes Rutherford Street as it passes through the town of Landrum, where it intersects US 176 (Howard Avenue) and Norfolk Southern's W Line. On the eastern edge of town, the state highway reaches its northern terminus at a diamond interchange with I-26. Landrum Road continues northeast as a state secondary highway to the North Carolina state line near the mountains.

Major intersections

Greer truck route

South Carolina Highway 14 Truck (SC 14 Truck) is a  truck route that is nearly entirely within the western part of Greer, in the east-central part of Greenville County. Part of its path is concurrent with U.S. Route 29 (US 29), SC 101, and SC 290 Truck.

The truck route begins at an intersection with the SC 14 mainline in the central part of the city. It takes South Buncombe Road to the northwest. The highway begins to curve to the north-northwest and passes Prisma Health Greer Memorial Hospital. It curves back to the northwest and travels on a bridge over some railroad tracks of Norfolk Southern Railway. It bends slightly more to the north and temporarily leaves the city limits of Greer. At a bridge over some railroad tracks of CSX, it re-enters the city. A short distance later, it intersects US 29 (Wade Hampton Boulevard). At this intersection, SC 101/SC 290, on North Buncombe Road, come in from the north-northwest. The four highways travel concurrently to the east-northeast.

A short distance later, they meet the southern terminus of Mt. Vernon Road. Here, SC 101/SC 290 splits off to the south-southeast, onto West Poinsett Street, while US 29/SC 14 Truck continue to the east-northeast, concurrent with SC 290 Truck, which begins at this intersection. Just before an intersection with the southern terminus of Ashmore Street, the roadway begins to curve to the east-southeast. Then, they intersect SC 14 (North Main Street). Here, SC 14 Truck reaches its northern terminus, while US 29 and SC 290 Truck continue to the east-southeast.

See also

References

External links

SC 14 at Virginia Highways' South Carolina Highways Annex

014
South Carolina Highway 14
South Carolina Highway 14
South Carolina Highway 14